Saint George of Kratovo was a South Slavic writer and silversmith from Kratovo.

Peja wrote the liturgical rite and biography (žitije) on Saint George between 1515 and 1523, in the Serbian recension of Church Slavonic, per Serbian sources, and in Bulgarian recension, according to Petăr Dinekov. The work was published by Serbian intellectual Stojan Novaković in 1867, transcribed from a manuscript held in the National Library of Serbia in Belgrade. Milan Milićević also wrote a work on Saint George in 1885.

In Bulgaria, where he is known as St. George the New of Sofia, he became especially honoured during the Bulgarian National Revival, after Paisius of Hilendar included him in the list of Bulgarian saints, in his Istoriya Slavyanobolgarskaya (1762). In 1855 Nikola Karastoyanov from Samokov printed the Life of St. George the New, based on a manuscript kept in the metropolitan library of Sofia. During the first half of the 19th century St. George the New became popular also among Bulgarian painters and was depicted in many churches.

In Peja's 16th century biography, it has been maintained that Saint George's was of Serbian origin. However, Bulgarian sources claim he and his parents were Bulgarians. 

Saint George was burnt alive on a pyre on 11 February 1515 in Sofia, after he refused to convert to Islam. His death lead to him being proclaimed a New Martyr.

According to the Orthodox Church, George of Kratovo is celebrated on 11 February and 26 May (Julian Calendar).

References

Further reading

Bulgarian saints
Serbian saints of the Eastern Orthodox Church
People from Kratovo, North Macedonia
1515 deaths
Christians executed for refusing to convert to Islam
New Martyrs
People executed by burning